Owen Guinn Smith (May 2, 1920 – January 20, 2004) was an American athlete, the 1948 Olympic champion in the pole vault.

Born in McKinney, Texas, Smith moved to California when he was a child. He was originally a high jumper, but UC Berkeley, the university he wanted to attend, already had a strong high jumping team, so he took up pole vaulting. He won the NCAA championships in 1941, the year before he graduated as a history major. During the remainder of World War II, Guinn Smith served as an air force pilot in Asia.

Smith, the 1947 national pole vault champion, was sent to the 1948 Olympics in London. During a rainy competition, Smith took the gold in his last attempt for 4.30 m (14 ft 1 in).

He died at age 83 in San Francisco of emphysema.

References

External links
 

1920 births
2004 deaths
American male pole vaulters
Athletes (track and field) at the 1948 Summer Olympics
California Golden Bears men's track and field athletes
Olympic gold medalists for the United States in track and field
Medalists at the 1948 Summer Olympics
People from McKinney, Texas
Track and field athletes from California
Deaths from emphysema
United States Army Air Forces pilots of World War II
Military personnel from Texas